The duck curve is a graph of power production over the course of a day that shows the timing imbalance between peak demand and solar power generation. Used in utility-scale electricity generation, the term was coined in 2012 by the California Independent System Operator.

Solar power 
In some energy markets, daily peak demand occurs after sunset, when solar power is no longer available. In locations where a substantial amount of solar electric capacity has been installed, the amount of power that must be generated from sources other than solar or wind displays a rapid increase around sunset and peaks in the mid-evening hours, producing a graph  that resembles the silhouette of a duck. In Hawaii, significant adoption of solar generation has led to the more pronounced curve known as the Nessie curve.

Without any form of energy storage, after times of high solar generation generating companies must rapidly increase other forms of power generation around the time of sunset to compensate for the loss of solar generation, a major concern for grid operators where there is rapid growth of photovoltaics. Storage such as dammed hydropower can fix these issues if it can be implemented. Short term use batteries, at a large enough scale of use, can help to flatten the duck curve and prevent generator use fluctuation and can help to maintain voltage profile.

Mitigation strategies
Methods for coping with the rapid increase in demand at sunset reflected in the duck curve, which becomes more serious as the penetration of solar generation grows, include:
Installing more dispatchable generation
Orienting some solar collectors toward the west to maximize generation near sunset. 
Energy storage including:
Pumped-storage hydroelectricity
Battery storage power stations These can be colocated with solar power plants that are designed with DC capacity above their AC rating, or at other suitable sites, including old fossil fuel plants so as to utilize their existing transmission infrastructure (e.g. the Moss Landing Power Plant).
Solar thermal energy with thermal energy storage
Ice storage air conditioning
Use of batteries in electric vehicles for temporary storage (vehicle-to-grid)
Power-to-X, storing surplus electricity production in chemical form, e.g. hydrogen
Green hydrogen production from water during the peak hours of Solar production
Energy demand management, including:
Time-of-use pricing (TOU) and real-time pricing
Smart grid technology
Electric power transmission from the west where the sun is shining to the east where the sun is low or set

A major challenge is deploying mitigating capacity at a rate that keeps up with the growth of solar energy production. The effects of the duck curve have happened faster than anticipated.

Duck curve in California

The California Independent System Operator (CAISO) has been monitoring and analyzing the Duck Curve and its future expectations for about a half a century now and their biggest finding is the growing gap between morning and evening hours prices relative to midday hours prices. According to their 2016 study, the U.S. Energy Information Administration, found that the wholesale energy market prices over the past six months during the 5 pm to 8 pm period (the "neck" of the duck) have increased to $60 per megawatt-hour, compared to about $35 per megawatt-hour in the same time frame in 2016. However, on the other side they have measured a drastic decrease in the midday prices, nearing $15 per megawatt-hour. These high peaks and deep valleys are only showing continued trends of going further apart making this Duck Curve even more prevalent as renewable energy production continues to grow.

A crucial part of this curve comes from the net load ("the difference between expected load and anticipated electricity production from the range of renewable energy sources"). In certain times of the year (namely Spring and Summer), the curves create a "belly" appearance in the midday that then drastically increases portraying an "arch" similar to the neck of a duck, consequently the name "The Duck Chart." This "neck" represents a ramp speed of between 10 and 17 GW in 3 hours (afternoon) in 2020 which has to be supplied by flexible generation. During the midday, large amounts of solar energy are created, which partially contributes to lower demand for additional electricity. Curtailment impacts the curve. Increasing battery storage can mitigate the issues of solar abundance during the day. When excess solar energy is stored during the day and used in the evening, the price disparity between inexpensive midday and expensive evening energy can be reduced. Enough total solar technology exists to power the world, but there is a current lack of infrastructure to store solar energy for later use. An oversupply of energy during low demand coupled with a lack of supply during high demand explains the large disparity between midday and evening energy prices. , up to 6 GWh is shifted per day from low price to high price periods.

See also 
 Dunkelflaute

References

External links
 Energy Storage and the California "Duck Curve"

Economics curves
Electric power generation
Solar energy